Strange Gods: The Great American Cult Scare is a 1981 nonfiction book by Anson D. Shupe and David G. Bromley about the "cult scare" in America in the 1970s. It was published by Beacon Press in Boston. Shupe and Bromley analyze six specific new religious movements (cults) – the Unification Church, the Church of Scientology, the Children of God, the Divine Light Mission, the International Society for Krishna Consciousness, and the Peoples Temple – in order to partially dispel myths about them.

Reception 
Mary Farrell Bednarowski for the Journal of the American Academy of Religion calls the book "particularly valuable for its insistence on the need for hard evidence regarding anti-cult claims". Lori Anderson Heflebower for Social Science Quarterly notes that "[w]hile solutions are not always offered to the multisided issues, the authors present a factual, descriptive view of the realities of the cult controversy". William L. Pitts for the Journal of Church and State acknowledges that "[m]any books on the cults are theological and polemical; this one is sociological and legal". Bill J. Leonard for Review & Expositor adds that the work is "a helpful supplement to more polemical analyses of the cults".

James A. Beckford for Sociological Analysis believes that the book has a "touch of media hype about it" and is in a lot of ways paradoxical like how it is well-written but "loosely reasoned". He believes that those familiar with the academic study of new religious movements will find little scholarly value from the work. Jack C. Ross for the Canadian Journal of Sociology also notes that anyone familiar with new religious movements can find "innumerable facts to quibble with, even if the authors' model and outline of the issues are acceptable".

References 

Books about cults
1981 non-fiction books
Beacon Press books
Sociology books
Sociology of religion
Books by David G. Bromley
Books about the United States